One Man Justice is a 1937 American Western film directed by Leon Barsha and written by Paul Perez. The film stars Charles Starrett, Barbara Weeks, Wally Wales, Jack Rube Clifford, Alan Bridge and Walter Downing. The film was released on July 1, 1937, by Columbia Pictures.

Plot

Cast           
Charles Starrett as Larry Clarke / Ted Crockett
Barbara Weeks as Mary Crockett
Wally Wales as Neal King
Jack Rube Clifford as Sheriff Ben Adams 
Alan Bridge as Red Grindy 
Walter Downing as Doc Willat
Mary Gordon as Bridget
Jack Lipson as Slim 
Edmund Cobb as Tex Wiley
Dick Curtis as Hank Skinner
Maston Williams as Lefty Gates
Harry Fleischmann as Joe Craig

References

External links
 

1937 films
American Western (genre) films
1937 Western (genre) films
Columbia Pictures films
Films directed by Leon Barsha
American black-and-white films
1930s English-language films
1930s American films